Košarkarski klub Ilirija or simply Ilirija is a basketball team based in Ljubljana, Slovenia. The team competes in the Slovenian First League, the top-tier league in Slovenia.

Current roster

Honours
Slovenian Republic League
 Winners: 1961, 1969, 1971, 1972, 1975, 1982

Slovenian Second League
 Winners: 2016–17, 2020–21

Slovenian Third Division
 Winners: 2015–16

Slovenian Fourth Division
 Winners: 2014–15

References

External links
Official website 

Basketball teams established in 1957
Basketball teams in Slovenia
Sports clubs in Ljubljana
Basketball teams in Yugoslavia
1957 establishments in Slovenia